The Haval H8 is a mid-size SUV produced by Haval, a sub-brand of Great Wall Motor.

Overview
The Haval H8 was previewed on the April 2012 Beijing Auto Show as the Great Wall Haval H7 concept, the production version was revealed on the Chinese car market during the 2013 Guangzhou Auto Show. Pricing of the Haval H8 SUV ranges from 183,800 to 231,800 yuan. The chassis of the H8 is a uni-body, while suspension in the front is double-wishbone independent with the rear being multi-link independent. Drive train options include both 4×2 and 4×4.

The Haval H8 is powered by a 2.0-litre turbo-petrol engine making 160kW at 5500rpm and 324Nm between 2000 and 4000rpm. The engine is mated to a ZF six-speed automatic gearbox. The torque is directed to the rear wheels by default, with a transfer case by Borg-Warner sending up to 50 per cent of torque to the front wheels when needed.

References

H8
 Crossover sport utility vehicles
Cars of China
Cars introduced in 2013